Latvian may refer to:  
Something of, from, or related to Latvia
Latvians, a Baltic ethnic group, native to what is modern-day Latvia and the immediate geographical region
Latvian language, also referred to as Lettish
Latvian cuisine
Latvian culture
Latvian horse
Latvian Gambit, an opening in chess

See also 
Latvia (disambiguation)

Language and nationality disambiguation pages